Hachita is a census-designated place in Grant County, New Mexico, United States. Its population was 49 as of the 2010 census. Hachita has a post office with ZIP code 88040. New Mexico State Road 9, New Mexico State Road 81, and New Mexico State Road 146 pass through the community. Hachita should not be confused with Old Hachita, which is a ghost town several miles west of town.

Demographics

See also

 List of census-designated places in New Mexico

References

External links

Census-designated places in New Mexico
Census-designated places in Grant County, New Mexico